Arpád Ludwig Nádai (3 April 1883 – 18 July 1963) was a Hungarian-born academic who was a professor of mechanics.

Early life and career
Nadai was born in Budapest, Hungary. He attended the University of Budapest for his undergraduate education. For doctorate, he went to Germany and studied at the Technical University of Berlin.

After he finished his education, in 1918, he joined University of Göttingen on a professorial position and later became head of the applied mechanics laboratory.

In 1952, he received Bingham Medal for his work.

In 1975, the American Society of Mechanical Engineers (ASME) established an award, Nadai Medal, named after him.

Publications
 Theory of flow and fracture of solids and Plasticity; a mechanics of the plastic state of matter

Awards
 Bingham Medal (1952)
 Worcester Reed Medal
 Timoshenko Medal
 Elliott Cresson Medal

References

1883 births
1963 deaths
Hungarian academics
Hungarian emigrants to the United States
People from Budapest
Academic staff of the University of Göttingen